The plain pigeon (Patagioenas inornata) is a species of bird in the family Columbidae. It is found in the four Greater Antilles: Cuba, Hispaniola (in the Dominican Republic and Haiti), Jamaica, and Puerto Rico. Its natural habitats are forest, woodland, coastal desert, mangrove and swampy areas. It is threatened by habitat loss and illegal hunting.

Description
The plain pigeon is a large-bodied bird (38 cm [15 in]) that superficially resembles the common city pigeon. At a distance it appears pale blue-gray overall. The head, hindneck, breast, and part of the folded wing are colored with a red-wine wash. When folded, the wing shows a white leading edge; in flight, it forms a conspicuous wing bar. Legs and feet are dark red. The female is slightly smaller and duller than the male. Juveniles are browner overall, with pale wing margins and dark eyes.

Taxonomy
The plain pigeon is thought to represent a fairly recent island adaptation of the red-billed pigeon (P. flavirostria) or the Maranon pigeon (P. oenops), found in Central and South America.

Subspecies
Three subspecies of the plain pigeon are recognized: 
P. i. inornata from Cuba and Hispaniola 
P. i. exigua from Jamaica 
P. i. wetmorei from Puerto Rico.
During the 1970s, P. i. wetmorei was on the brink of extinction. A conservation program was introduced to save the species and now it numbers a few thousand individuals.

References

External links
BirdLife Species Factsheet.
Plain pigeon videos, images and sounds on the Internet Bird Collection

plain pigeon
Birds of the Greater Antilles
Birds of the Dominican Republic
Birds of Haiti
Endemic birds of the Caribbean
plain pigeon
Taxonomy articles created by Polbot